El Paso City is a studio album by country music singer Marty Robbins. It was released in 1976 by Columbia Records. Billy Sherrill was the producer.

The album debuted on Billboard magazine's country album chart on September 4, 1976, peaked at No. 1, and remained on the chart for a total of 28 weeks. The album included the No. 1 hit single, "El Paso City".

AllMusic gave the album a rating of four-and-a-half stars.

Track listing
Side A
 "El Paso City"
 "Ava Maria Morales"
 "I'm Gonna Miss You When You Go"
 "Kin to the Wind"
 "Way Out There"

Side B
 "The Ballad of Bill Thaxton"
 "Trail Dreamin'"
 "I Did What I Did for Maria"
 "She's Just a Drifter"
 "Among My Souvenirs"

References

1976 albums
Marty Robbins albums
Columbia Records albums